Rex Regum Qeon (RRQ) is an esports organization based in Indonesia. The organization competes in professional tournaments in the sports: Mobile Legends: Bang Bang, PUBG Mobile, Free Fire, Valorant, FIFA, League of Legends: Wild Rift and Sausage Man.

RRQ was ranked as the third most popular esports organization team in the world in 2020. In a report released by Shareable titled "The State of Social Media 2020", the team's fan activity on social media throughout 2020 had reached 26.5 million activities.

About

History
Rex Regum Qeon (RRQ) was founded in October 2013 by Adrian Pauline, the CEO of RRQ, and Riki K. Suliawan, founder of RRQ. Began as a gaming hobby of both founders, their interest in Dota 2 championship eventually made its way into the formation of the organization.

From 2013 to 2017, RRQ had only one division team, which was Dota 2. Adrian Pauline stated that, in the beginning, the organization was only run as a hobby and side job, and wasn't focused on their business. In 2014, Esports gained popularity growth, Andrian Pauline, who was originally a Product Director at QEON Interactive, resigned from the office and shifted his focus to the team, since then RRQ started to focus on their businesses. In 2017 RRQ had recruited another three new esports divisions, the new divisions are RRQ Endeavour in Point Blank, RRQ2 in Mobile Legends, and one division team in PUBG that were relatively short serving period. At the end of 2019, Adrian Pauline decided to move RRQ Endeavor to the Call of Duty Mobile division from Point Blank.

RRQ had expanded its international branches to Japan, Thailand, and Malaysia. Today, the only remaining international branch of RRQ is Thailand.

In February 2019, the organization had previously signed a partnership with a European football club, Paris Saint-Germain F.C. (PSG), It was announced in a Press Conference held at The Dharmawangsa Hotel, Jakarta. Through its esports division, PSG esports had officially collaborated with Team RRQ for the 3rd Season of Mobile Legends: Bang Bang Professional League Indonesia on 16 February 2019. Their partnership had ended in July 2019.

In 2020, RRQ is ranked third as the most popular esport organization in the world in terms of activity on social media. A report released by Shareable, a data monitoring company based in New York, USA. In a report titled "The State of Social Media 2020", RRQ's fan activity on social media throughout 2020 was 26.5 million activities. This number is only behind Faze Clan with 142.9 million activities and G2 Esports with 38.1 million activities.

Salary
Adrian Pauline, CEO of RRQ, during an interview with Kompas TV in 2021, stated that his Esport organization paid team players a monthly income, roughly around 1 to 3 million Rupiahs per months.

Expansion 
After concluding in the MLBB M3 World Championship, Brazilian Representatives VIVO Keyd Stars' roster disbanded. This was later confirmed by one of its roster members. However, during the eve of the ninth season of MPL Indonesia, RRQ announced their expansion to MPL Brazil, to form RRQ Akira. The roster mainly comprised most of the players of Keyd Stars.

Brand Ambassadors 
Since 2021, RRQ has three Brand Ambassadors. The chosen brand ambassador must be at least well known and is certainly familiar with the world of esports (i.e. former brand ambassador of any esports team).

The Brand Ambassadors are, as described below.

Windah Basudara 
Windah Basudara is an Indonesian YouTuber, known for his gameplay live streams on YouTube. He was appointed as the Brand Ambassador of RRQ on 8 June 2021, which was announced on RRQ's Instagram account.

Mega Dwi Cahyani 
Mega Dwi Cahyani (born, Purwodadi, 1 September 1999.), professionally known under the nickname Cahyaniryn, is an Indonesian YouTuber and Tiktoker known for her PUBG gameplay content. She received an award of the Popular Creator of The Year in the 2020 TikTok Awards Indonesia. She was appointed as the Brand Ambassador of RRQ on 23 October 2021.

Syalma Nabillah 
Syalma Nabillah Ulayya (born Bandung, 2001) is an Indonesian Tiktoker, she was appointed as the Brand Ambassador of RRQ on 8 December 2021.

Championships

Mobile Legends: Bang Bang

Mobile Legends: Bang Bang World Championship 

Reference:

Mobile Legends: Bang Bang Southeast Asia Cup

Mobile Legends: Bang Bang Professional League 

Reference:

Mobile Legends: Bang Bang Development League 

Reference:

Rosters

Mobile Legends: Bang Bang 
RRQ Hoshi was initially named as "RRQ O2" during MPL Indonesia Season 2 in August 2017.

Hoshi

Sena

Mika

Former

PUBG Mobile 

Formerly, RRQ had a Thailand Roster of PUBG: Mobile named RRQ Athena that was officially disbanded and was released by the organisation in 2021. RRQ would keep RRQ Ryu, the Indonesian Division to compete further in the game PUBG Mobile.

Free Fire 

Kazu

Hide

VALORANT

FIFA

League of Legends: Wild Rift

Sausage Man

References 

Esports teams based in Indonesia
Mobile Legends: Bang Bang teams